Khowai River is a trans-boundary river that originates in the eastern part of the Atharamura Hills of Tripura in India.

Geography 
Flowing north-north-west, it leaves India at Khowai, and enters Bangladesh at Balla in Habiganj District. The river passes east of Habiganj town, where it is under pressure from encroachment and pollution. North of town it turns west, and joins the Kushiyara near Adampur in Lakhai Upazila, Kishoreganj District. The river is 166 km long. It is the second longest river of Tripura.

See also

List of rivers of Bangladesh
List of rivers of India
Rivers of India

References

International rivers of Asia
Rivers of Bangladesh
Rivers of Tripura
Bay of Bengal
Habiganj District
Kishoreganj District
Distributaries of the Ganges
Rivers of India
Rivers of Sylhet Division
Rivers of Dhaka Division